Ajay Chuttoo (born 13 November 1965) is a Mauritian long-distance runner. He competed in the men's marathon at the 1996 Summer Olympics.

References

External links
 

1965 births
Living people
Athletes (track and field) at the 1996 Summer Olympics
Mauritian male long-distance runners
Mauritian male marathon runners
Olympic athletes of Mauritius
Mauritian people of Indian descent